Antiguans and Barbudans in the United Kingdom are residents or citizens of the United Kingdom who can trace their roots to Antigua and Barbuda.

Population
At the time of the 2001 UK Census, 3,891 people born in Antigua and Barbuda were living in the United Kingdom, representing around 1.5 per cent of all Caribbean-born people living in the country. In 2001, Antigua and Barbuda was the 11th most common birthplace in the Caribbean for British residents and 109th most common out of all nations.

See also
 Black British
 British Mixed
 Caribbean British
 British African-Caribbean people

References

External links
 The Antiguan Embassy in London
UK Caribbean Community
 BBC Born Abroad - The Caribbean
 Myspace Profile set up in the UK for Antiguans abroad

United Kingdom
 
Antiguan
Caribbean British
Immigration to the United Kingdom by country of origin